The Agricultural Entry Act allowed Federal lands containing minerals, petroleum, nitrate, phosphate, potash, oil, gas, and asphalt to be leased to private developers, as long as such deposits in specially zoned lands were left alone. The Federal government reserved the right to abrogate whatever uses the surrounding lands had been developed for in the event that it was deemed necessary for deposit procurement.

References 

63rd United States Congress
United States federal public land legislation